Eskimo Nell, also known as The Ballad of Eskimo Nell and as The Sexy Saga of Naughty Nell and Big Dick, is a 1975 British sex comedy film directed by Martin Campbell and produced by Stanley Long. Though inspired by "The Ballad of Eskimo Nell", the movie owes little to the original bawdy song.

Plot
Budding film director Dennis Morrison (Michael Armstrong), producer Clive Potter (Terence Edmond), and screenwriter Harris Tweedle (Christopher Timothy) are hired by seedy erotic film producer Benny U. Murdoch (Roy Kinnear) to make a dirty movie based on the poem "The Ballad of Eskimo Nell". However they run into difficulty when each of the production's backers want a completely different style of film made. Then Murdoch makes off with the money and the three have to produce four different versions of the movie to keep everybody happy - a gay Western, a hardcore porno, a Kung Fu-style musical, and a wholesome family production.

Cast

 Roy Kinnear as Benny U. Murdoch
 Anna Quayle as Reverend Mother
 Katy Manning as Hermione
 Christopher Timothy as Harris Tweedle
 Michael Armstrong as Dennis Morrison
 Terence Edmond as Clive Potter
 Rosalind Knight as Lady Longhorn
 Diane Langton as Gladys Armitage
 Richard Caldicot as Ambrose Cream
 Beth Porter as Billie Harris
 Christopher Biggins as Jeremy
 Gordon Tanner as Big Dick
 Jonathan Adams as Lord Coltwind
 Lloyd Lamble as The Bishop
 Christopher Neil as Brendan
 Nicholas Young as Deadeye Dick
 Stephanie Cole as Traffic Warden (uncredited)
 Mary Millington as Stripping Traffic Warden (uncredited)

Background
Many of the film's characters are based on real personalities of the time. Lady Longhorn and Lord Coltwind — the backers of the wholesome family version — are thinly veiled caricatures of Mary Whitehouse and Lord Longford. Benny U. Murdoch is loosely based on Tony Tenser, head of Tigon films. A more obscure figure the film ridicules is Louis "Deke" M. Heyward, the London representative of AIP (American International Pictures), who had previously clashed with the film's writer Michael Armstrong in 1969 during the making of Armstrong's directing debut, The Haunted House of Horror. In Eskimo Nell Heyward is parodied as "Big Dick", a crass, foul-mouthed American producer from "A.W.P Films", and the backer of the hardcore porno version. A similar character had previously appeared in Armstrong's script for The Sex Thief in 1973.

A pre-fame Mary Millington, then just a jobbing actress and model using her married name Mary Maxted, has a small role in the film as a stripping traffic warden who auditions for a part in the film within a film.  Although Millington appears only fleetingly (with her audition speeded up for comic effect), stills from her scene were used to publicize the film in magazines including Titbits and Cinema X.

The film is not to be confused with Richard Franklin's 1975 film The True Story of Eskimo Nell which was released in the UK as Dick Down Under. Campbell's film was re-titled The Sexy Saga of Naughty Nell and Big Dick in Australia.

Home media

Eskimo Nell was released in a 'special edition' DVD and Blu-ray on 16 February 2015, to celebrate its 40th anniversary (the film was originally released in London in January 1975). The new edition has been digitally re-mastered at Pinewood Studios and comes with several extra features including the original theatrical trailer (unseen since 1975), an audio commentary by the film's actor-writer Michael Armstrong and film historian Simon Sheridan, an 8-page booklet, plus an extensive stills gallery and a newly re-mastered version of Mary Millington's short 1974 film Wild Lovers.

References
 
X-Rated - Adventures of an Exploitation Filmmaker by Simon Sheridan (Reynolds & Hearn books) 2008
Keeping the British End Up: Four Decades of Saucy Cinema by Simon Sheridan (Titan books) (fourth edition) 2011

External links
 

1970s English-language films
British sex comedy films
1970s sex comedy films
Films directed by Martin Campbell
1975 films
1975 comedy films
1970s British films